Graham Shaw (born 14 March 1962) is a former English cricketer.  Shaw was a right-handed batsman who bowled right-arm off break.  He was born at Saltburn-by-the-Sea, Yorkshire.

Shaw represented the Durham Cricket Board in List A cricket.  His debut List A match came against Oxfordshire in the 1999 NatWest Trophy.  From 1999 to 2000, he represented the county in 4 List A matches, the last of which came against Denmark in the 2000 NatWest Trophy.  In his 4 List A matches, he scored 26 runs at a batting average of 8.66, with a high score of 14*.  In the field he also took 2 catches.  With the ball he took 2 wickets at a bowling average of 32.00, with best figures of 1/27.

References

External links
Graham Shaw at Cricinfo
Graham Shaw at CricketArchive

1966 births
Living people
People from Saltburn-by-the-Sea
English cricketers
Durham Cricket Board cricketers
Cricketers from Yorkshire